"Little Bird" is a song composed and recorded by Scottish singer-songwriter Annie Lennox. Taken from her debut solo album, Diva (1992), it was released in 1993 as a double A-side with "Love Song for a Vampire" (which appeared on the soundtrack for the Francis Ford Coppola film Bram Stoker's Dracula) in Ireland, the United Kingdom, and various other European countries. In other territories, "Little Bird" was released alone.

Lennox performed "Little Bird" during the 2012 Summer Olympics closing ceremony in London on 12 August 2012. A live version was played in the end credits to The Sopranos episode "Eloise". The song was also featured in the film Striptease, where Demi Moore dances to it. The video for "Little Bird" does not appear on the video album for Diva, but is heard instrumentally over the end credits.

Chart performance
"Little Bird" / "Love Song for a Vampire" was successful on the charts on several continents, peaking at number one on both the RPM Dance/Urban chart in Canada and the Billboard Dance Club Songs chart in the United States. In Europe, it made it to the top 10 in Italy (8), Ireland (3), Portugal (6), Spain and the United Kingdom, as well as on the European Hot 100 Singles, where it reached number five in March 1993. In the UK, the single peaked at number three in its first week at the UK Singles Chart, on 7 February 1993. On the UK Dance Singles Chart, it reached number two. Additionally, it was a top-30 hit in Germany (29) and Iceland (27), and a top-40 hit in Switzerland (34). In the United States, "Little Bird" also peaked at number 49 on the Billboard Hot 100, while in Canada, it reached number seven on the RPM Top Singles chart. 

It earned a silver record in the UK, after 200,000 singles were sold. In 2012, after Lennox performed the song during the 2012 Summer Olympics closing ceremony, it charted as a solo single for the first time, reaching number 96 on the UK Singles Chart.

Critical reception
Swedish Aftonbladet wrote that "Little Bird" is based on "a vibrant sight loop not quite unlike many old Eurythmics songs". Larry Flick from Billboard described it as "a synth-driven thumper that harks back to her early Eurythmics tenure. Icy cool instrumentation is contrasted by a passionate vocal and an elastic bass line". He also complimented the song as "adventurous". Randy Clark from Cashbox viewed it as a "beat-laden pop/rock ditty", adding, "although slightly less artsy musically than the first two singles, "Little Bird" has wings of its own." Dave Sholin from the Gavin Report found that Lennox' "hit streak is about to carryover into 1993 on the wings of a sensitively written and brilliantly produced song that expresses what many people feel from time to time. All that, and it's uptempo!" 

Matthew Cole from Music Weeks RM Dance Update called it a "luscious tune". Another editor, James Hamilton, described it as a "perky strutter". Alec Foege from Spin named it the album's "finest track", saying "Its call-and-response woo-woos exude genuine confidence, cleverness, and craft." Richard Riccio from St. Petersburg Times declared it as "an obvious hit with a menacing beat and infectious vocal hook. Although quite similar rhythmically to the early Eurythmics' hit "Love Is a Stranger", there's more soul than detachment here, and Lennox hoots and hollers during the chorus, pulling you into the fun." Craig S. Semon from Telegram & Gazette described it as "punchy" and "bittersweet", adding that "Lennox's vocals soar as she fantasizes about being a free-flying, cheerful bird. The song's pain comes from Lennox realizing that such freedom and happiness are unattainable for her."

Retrospective response
In an 2009 review, Mike Ragogna from HuffPost wrote that in the song, "Lennox observes the creature's freedom as it glides across the sky. Though the song starts out with self-doubt, she concludes, "...this little bird's fallen out of that nest now...so I've just got to put these wings to test", and both she and the collection soar from that point on." In an 2015 review, Pop Rescue noted that it "has a wonderful electro-pop feel to it – the beat and swirling synth helps the song grow wonderfully as Annie sings over the top."

Music video
The accompanying music video for "Little Bird" was directed by Sophie Muller and features eight Lennox lookalikes dressed as the many different personas that Lennox has used in her videos (both solo and as part of Eurythmics) over the past decade, with Lennox herself in a Cabaret-esque setting acting as ringmaster. Gradually the personas begin to squabble for the spotlight, pushing aside one another and Lennox herself as she fights to maintain control.

The music videos referenced by the personas include:
"Sweet Dreams (Are Made of This)"
"There Must Be an Angel (Playing with My Heart)"
"Thorn in My Side"
"Beethoven (I Love to Listen To)"
"I Need a Man"
"Why"
"Walking on Broken Glass"
The Freddie Mercury Tribute Concert

Lennox was in late stages of pregnancy with her second daughter Tali during the filming of the video. The "ringmaster" persona, played by Lennox, wears a black dress designed to give the illusion of being close-fitting, with a fully sequinned front and a flowing matte back panel that together partially conceal her baby bump.

Track listings
All tracks were written by Annie Lennox unless otherwise noted.CD – Arista (US) The final three tracks were recorded live for MTV Unplugged at the Montreux Jazz Festival in Montreux, Switzerland, 3 July 1992.CD – BMG (UK)12-inch – Arista (US)'

 House of Gypsies mixes by Todd Terry

Charts

Weekly charts

Year-end charts

Certifications and sales

See also
 List of number-one dance singles of 1993 (U.S.)
 List of RPM number-one dance singles of 1993

References

1992 songs
1993 singles
Annie Lennox songs
Arista Records singles
Bertelsmann Music Group singles
Columbia Records singles
Music videos directed by Sophie Muller
Song recordings produced by Stephen Lipson
Songs written by Annie Lennox